Timeline of anthropology, 2000–2009

Events
2002
The French government returns the remains of Saartjie Baartman to South Africa, where she is buried
2003
The First Homo Floresiensis remains are found
The National Museum of Iraq in Baghdad and archaeological sites throughout Iraq are looted
2004
The National Museum of the American Indian moves to its present location on the National Mall in Washington, D.C.

Publications
2004
Native Anthropology: The Japanese Challenge to Western Academic Hegemony, by Takami Kuwayama

Births

Deaths
2001
Abner Cohen
Derek Freeman
Marvin Harris
George Harrison

2002
Pierre Bourdieu
Raymond Firth
Stephen Jay Gould
Thor Heyerdahl
2003
Isaac Schapera
2004
Jean Rouch

Awards
2001
Margaret Mead Award: Mimi Nichter
Victor Turner Prize: Tanya M. Luhrman for Of Two Minds: The Growing Disorder in American Psychiatry

2003
Margaret Mead Award: Marc Sommers
Victor Turner Prize: Alan Klima for The Funeral Casino: Meditation, Massacre, and Exchange with the Dead in Thailand and Hugh Raffles for In Amazonia: A Natural History
2004
Margaret Mead Award: Donna Goldstein
Victor Turner Prize: John M. Chernoff for Hustling Is Not Stealing: Stories of an African Bar Girl
2005
Margaret Mead Award: Luke Eric Lassiter
2006
Margaret Mead Award: 
2007
Margaret Mead Award: João Biehl
2008
Margaret Mead Award: Daniel Jordan Smith
2009
Margaret Mead Award: Sverker Finnström

Anthropology by decade
Anthropology
Anthropology timelines
2000s decade overviews
Anthropology